Lopate may refer to:

People 
Leonard Lopate (born 1940), American, radio talk show host
Phillip Lopate (born 1943), American writer

Places 
Big Lapati, also known as "Big Lopate", a village in India
Lopate, a village near Podgorica, Montenegro
Lopate, Kumanovo, North Macedonia

Other uses 
Battle of Lopate (1796), between Old Montenegro and the Ottoman Empire